German submarine U-92 was a Type VIIC U-boat of Nazi Germany's Kriegsmarine during World War II.

She was laid down at the Flender Werke in Lübeck as yard number 296, launched on 10 January 1942 and commissioned on 3 March 1942. The boat was put out of service on 12 October 1944, and eventually broken up in 1944 – 45.

Design
German Type VIIC submarines were preceded by the shorter Type VIIB submarines. U-92 had a displacement of  when at the surface and  while submerged. She had two shafts and two  propellers.

U-92 was fitted with five  torpedo tubes (four fitted at the bow and one at the stern), fourteen torpedoes, one  SK C/35 naval gun, 220 rounds, and a  C/30 anti-aircraft gun. The boat had a complement of between forty-four and sixty.

Summary of raiding history

References

Notes

Citations

Bibliography

External links

German Type VIIC submarines
U-boats commissioned in 1942
World War II submarines of Germany
1942 ships
Ships built in Lübeck
Maritime incidents in October 1944